Lasco was a seasonal logging camp in Lassen County, California.

Lasco was the site of a prominent logging camp constructed in 1922.  It opened in 1923, and was a seasonal home for 250 loggers as well as their families.  The camp was reportedly so attractive that cars would pull in thinking it was a summer resort.

Seasonal occupation ended after the 1930 logging season.  Evidence of the camp could still be found on the ground according to a 1983 U.S. Forest Service report.

The former Lasco rail station now lies along the Bizz Johnson trail, which was created after the Fernley and Lassen Railway line was abandoned in 1978.

References

External links
 Camp Lasco photos (c. 1923), UNLV Libraries.

Unincorporated communities in California
Unincorporated communities in Lassen County, California